Ommastrephidae is a family of squid containing three subfamilies, 11 genera, and over 20 species. They are widely distributed globally and are extensively fished for food. One species, Todarodes pacificus, comprised around half of the world's cephalopod catch annually.

Some members of Ommastrephidae are known for their jet-propelled flight, earning them the common name of "flying squid".

Description

The mantle narrows towards the back and possesses large terminal fins. The family is characterized by an inverted T-shaped funnel locking cartilage. They have an easily recognizable, slender, feather-shaped gladius with a hollow cone structure (the primary conus). Light organs (photophores) are present along the head and mantle of members of the subfamily Ommastrephinae.

Ommastrephid arms have a double series of suckers. The enlarged tips (the clubs) of the tentacles have four rows of suckers, except in the genus Illex, which has eight. Hooks are absent. One of the ventral arms develops into a secondary sexual organ (the hectocotylus) in males.

All ommastrephids are active predators. Their arms and tentacles bear sharp teeth and are used to grasp and bring prey to their beaked mouths. They are very strong swimmers, and some species are known to glide out of water to escape predators.

Ommastrephid paralarvae are distinctive for having fused tentacles, looking like a single "proboscis".

Distribution and habitat
Ommastrephids usually occur in pelagic waters, but can also be found in neritic habitats. They are found worldwide.

Taxonomy
 

Ommastrephidae was first established by the Danish zoologist Japetus Steenstrup in 1857. It is classified under the suborder Oegopsina of the order Teuthida (squids). It is divided into three subfamilies – Illicinae, Ommastrephinae, and Todarodinae; further subdivided into 11 genera and more than 20 species.

These subfamilies, genera, species, and subspecies are classified under Ommastrephidae:
Family Ommastrephidae
Subfamily Illicinae
Genus Illex
 Illex argentinus, Argentine shortfin squid
 Illex coindetii, southern shortfin squid
 Illex illecebrosus, northern shortfin squid
 Illex oxygonius, sharptail shortfin squid
Subfamily Ommastrephinae
Genus Dosidicus
 Dosidicus gigas, Humboldt squid, jumbo flying squid or jumbo squid
Genus Eucleoteuthis
 Eucleoteuthis luminosa, striped squid or luminous flying squid
Genus Hyaloteuthis
 Hyaloteuthis pelagica, glassy flying squid
Genus Ommastrephes
 Ommastrephes bartramii, neon flying squid or red flying squid
Genus Ornithoteuthis
 Ornithoteuthis antillarum, Atlantic bird squid
 Ornithoteuthis volatilis, shiny bird squid
Genus Sthenoteuthis
 Sthenoteuthis oualaniensis, purpleback squid or purpleback flying squid
 Sthenoteuthis pteropus, orangeback squid or orangeback flying squid
Subfamily Todarodinae
Genus Martialia
Martialia hyadesii, sevenstar flying squid
Genus Nototodarus
 Nototodarus gouldi, Gould's flying squid
 Nototodarus hawaiiensis, Hawaiian flying squid
Nototodarus sloanii, Wellington flying squid or New Zealand arrow squid
Genus Todarodes
 Todarodes angolensis, Angola flying squid
Todarodes filippovae, Antarctic flying squid
 Todarodes pacificus, Japanese flying squid or Japanese common squid
 Todarodes pusillus, little flying squid 
 Todarodes sagittatus, European flying squid
Genus Todaropsis
 Todaropsis eblanae, lesser flying squid

See also
Loliginidae

References

External links

Ommastrephidae discussion forum at TONMO.com
Tree of Life web project: Ommastrephidae
Scientific American: Can a Squid Fly Out of the Water?

Squid
Cephalopod families